Definitivamente may refer to:
 Definitivamente (album), a 1991 album by Lourdes Robles
 Definitivamente (song), a song by Daddy Yankee and Sech